Edward Gilmore (January 4, 1867 – April 10, 1924) was a United States representative from Massachusetts. He was born in Brockton, Massachusetts. He attended the public schools, and Massachusetts State University extension classes. He engaged in mercantile pursuits. He was a member of the Democratic State committee 1896–1903, and was a delegate to the Democratic National Conventions in 1900 and 1904. He served as president of the Brockton Board of Aldermen 1901–1906.

He was a member of the Massachusetts House of Representatives in 1907 and 1908. He was elected as a Democrat to the Sixty-third Congress (March 4, 1913 – March 3, 1915). He then served as postmaster of Brockton 1915–1923, city assessor in 1923 and 1924, and died in Boston on April 19, 1924. His interment was in Calvary Cemetery in Brockton.

References

External links
 

Democratic Party members of the Massachusetts House of Representatives
Politicians from Brockton, Massachusetts
1867 births
1924 deaths
Democratic Party members of the United States House of Representatives from Massachusetts
Massachusetts postmasters
Massachusetts city council members